Derek "Deek" Cameron is a shinty referee and ex-shinty player from Fort William, Scotland.  As a player for Fort William Shinty Club, he holds the record for the fastest goal scored in the Camanachd Cup final, an effort within 7 seconds in Fort's 1992 victory..

Shinty career

Cameron, playing for Fort William Shinty Club, was a part of the successful Camanachd Cup winning team of 1992, scoring after only seven seconds. He continued playing for the second team after retiring from first team action.
In 2008, Cameron moved into refereeing.  He also won his first ever Sutherland Cup medal in 1984.
In 2011, Cameron refereed the Macaulay Cup and the Camanachd Cup final.  In the Camanachd Cup final, his record was almost broken by Danny MacRae of Newtonmore, who scored within 12 seconds.

External links
Cameron named Referee for 2011 Camanachd Cup

Shinty players
Living people
People from Fort William, Highland
Year of birth missing (living people)